Ahmadu Umaru Fintiri (born October 27, 1967) is a Nigerian politician and the current Governor of Adamawa State.  He was a member of the Adamawa State House of Assembly and was appointed the Speaker of the House. He became the acting Governor of Adamawa State following the impeachment of Admiral Murtala Nyako the former governor of the state, in July 2014,  handing later to Bala James Ngilari after serving for three months.

After the collation of results of the state gubernatorial election on the 9th of March 2019, Fintiri emerged as winner of the election with the highest number of votes. However, the election was declared inconclusive because the number of cancelled votes was moregreatern the margin between the winner and his close opponent. In the early hours of Friday, Iri was declared winner of the by-election in Tr, having secured 376,552 votes to defeat the incumbent Governor Jib,rilla Bindow of the All Progressives Congress (APC), who polled 336,386 votes.

Political career
In the March 9 2019 Adamawa State gubernatorial election and upon the completion of March 28, 2019 Adamawa State supplementary election, Ahmad was declared winner of the Eelection,having polled 376,552 votes ,defeating the Iicumbent governor ,Bindo Jibrilla of the All Progressive Congress ,who polled 336,386 votes.

He held a number of leadership positions in the House of Assembly before being elected Speaker, a position he held until 2015. Ahmadu Fintiri has twice been governor of Adamawa State. Following the impeachment of then-Governor Murtala Nyako in July 2014, he was appointed acting governor. He delegated control to Bala James Ngilari after three months.

On March 9, 2019, Ahmadu Fintiri, a member of the Peoples Democratic Party (PDP), was elected governor of Adamawa State. However, the election was declared inconclusive because the number of revoked ballots exceeded the margin between the winner and his closest opponent.

Personal life 
Mr. Fintiri is married and also the father of three children. Lami Ahmadu Fintiri is the name of his wife.

Parents 
Fintiri has recently lost his mother. According to a state government announcement, the mother, Hajiya Fatima Umar Badami, died after a long illness at the Federal Medical Centre in Yola. His father, Umaru Badami, died after a long illness at the Federal Medical Centre (FMC) in Yola. Mr. Badami, 82, left the Army in 1984. He was afterwards buried in the Yolas Damare Muslim cemetery in accordance with Islamic customs.

See also
List of Governors of Adamawa State

References

Living people
Nigerian Muslims
Governors of Adamawa State
People from Adamawa State
Politicians from Adamawa state
Marghi people
1967 births